Hot One is a rock band formed in 2005. Its members are guitarist/vocalist Nathan Larson, bassist/vocalist Emm Gryner, drummer Kevin March, and guitarist Jordan Kern. The band is characterized by a glam rock/post-punk sound and overtly political lyrical content. Hot One's self-titled debut album was released October 10, 2006. 

Former and current bands associated with Hot One include Shudder to Think, Guided by Voices and The Dambuilders.

History 
Having grown up in the Dischord records-dominated punk scene of Washington DC, Larson spent the 1990s as the lead guitarist for Shudder To Think. He split with the band in 1999 and went on to write scores for such films as Boys Don't Cry, Dirty Pretty Things, Tigerland, Palindromes, The Woodsman and Little Fish among others. 

Tiring of scoring, Larson returned to playing guitar and recruited Emm Gryner, an independent Canadian singer-songwriter with several self-released records and a stint backing up David Bowie among her many credits, as bass player. Gryner brought with her guitarist Jordan Kern of the Toronto-based band ESCALATE. 

Next to sign on was Larson's ex-bandmate (in both Shudder To Think and the short-lived indie group Mind Science Of the Mind), Kevin March, who can also be credited as an ex-member of The Dambuilders and Those Bastard Souls. Kevin had served as the drummer for Guided by Voices over the last years of the band's life, and was looking for his next move.

Between October and late December, the band wrote the material which would comprise their debut album. Recordings were made in Williamsburg, Brooklyn, in the early days of 2006. The album was tracked and mixed entirely by the band themselves.

Albums
 Hot One October 10, 2006 Modern Imperial Records through United For Opportunity

External links 
Official site
MySpace page

American rock music groups
Musical groups established in 2005